Amanda Mindy Samaroo (born 2 November 1992) is a Trinidadian former cricketer who played as a right-handed batter. She appeared in 3 One Day Internationals and 5 Twenty20 Internationals for the West Indies between 2009 and 2012. She played domestic cricket for Trinidad and Tobago.

References

External links

1992 births
Living people
Trinidad and Tobago women cricketers
West Indian women cricketers
West Indies women One Day International cricketers
West Indies women Twenty20 International cricketers
Trinidad and Tobago people of Indian descent